Bryozoichthys is a genus of marine ray-finned fishes belonging to the family Stichaeidae. These fishes are found in the North Pacific Ocean.

Species 
The genus contains the following species:

References

Chirolophinae